Danville Park is a green lung of protected coastal lowland forest and wetland in Durban North, South Africa.  The park is home to a number of bird species including the Egyptian Goose.

Sports fields can be found at the entrance of the park, which are made use of by Virginia United Football Club.

References 

Nature reserves in South Africa